Events from the year 1724 in Sweden

Incumbents
 Monarch – Frederick I

Events

 - Defense treaty between Sweden and Russia. 
 - The Product Act ban all foreign ships to import products from any other nations than their own. 
 - New law on schooling: all parents are obliged to learn their children read and write, or have teachers to do so. This law is in effect until 1807.

Births

 16 January - Per Krafft the Elder, portraitist  (died 1793) 
 
 
 
 10 July - Eva Ekeblad, scientist   (died 1786) 

 - Ulrika Strömfelt, politically active courtier (died 1780)

Deaths

 
 20 September - David von Krafft, painter   (born 1655) 
 - Urban Hjärne, chemist  (born 1641) 
 
 - Beata Sparre, politically active courtier (born 1662)

References

 
Years of the 18th century in Sweden
Sweden